Quassia sanguinea is a species of plant in the Simaroubaceae family. It is found in Cameroon and Nigeria. Its natural habitats are subtropical or tropical moist lowland forests and subtropical or tropical moist montane forests. It is threatened by habitat loss.

References

sanguinea
Vulnerable plants
Taxonomy articles created by Polbot